Arizona is a 1913 American silent Western film directed by Augustus Thomas based on his 1899 play Arizona which on stage starred Vincent Serrano and Eleanor Robson. It is one of the first feature films made in the United States, alongside Cleopatra and Richard III. Cyril Scott plays the lead Lt. Denton.

This film is now lost.

Cast
 Robert Broderick – Henry Canby
 Cyril Scott – Lt. Denton
 Gail Kane – Bonita Canby
 William Conklin – Captain Hodgman
 Francis Carlyle – Colonel Bonham
 H. D. Blakemore – Dr. Fenlon
 Alma Bradley – Lena Kellar
 Gertrude Shipman – Estrella Bonham
 Wong Ling – Sam Wong
 Elizabeth McCall – Mrs. Canby
 Charles E. Davenport – Tony Mostano
 Charles E. Graham – Sergeant Kellar

See also
 Arizona (1918)
 Arizona (1931)

References

External links

 
 
 lobby poster – vintage(Wayback Machine)

1913 films
1913 Western (genre) films
1913 lost films
American films based on plays
American black-and-white films
Lost American films
Lost Western (genre) films
Silent American Western (genre) films
1910s American films
1910s English-language films